School District 51 Boundary is a school district in British Columbia. Centred in Grand Forks, it covers an area west to the outskirts of Kelowna, British Columbia and all along the border with the United States. This includes the communities of Midway, Greenwood, Beaverdell, and Rock Creek.

History
School District 51 was created in 1996 with the merger of School District No. 12 (Grand Forks) and School District No. 13 (Kettle Valley).

Schools

See also
 List of school districts in British Columbia

Boundary Country
51